Fäyzullin Cäwdät Xaris ulı (Tatar: Фәйзуллин Җәүдәт Харис улы, pronounced )  Cäwdät Fäyzi (Җәүдәт Фәйзи , anglicized as Jaudat Faizi;  Fayzi (Fayzullin) Dzhaudat Kharisovich; 1910–1973) was a Tatar composer and folklorist. People's Artist of TASSR (1964), TASSR (1944) and RSFSR (1957) Honoured Worker of Culture.

In 1939-1941 Fäyzi was a chief of musical division and conductor in Tatar Academic Theatre, in 1944-1947, 1952-1957 he was a chief and artistic leader of Tatar Philharmonic Society.

Major works: opera The Unshipped Letters (1960), 4 musical comedy (including the most famous My Slippers), more than 200 song and romance, arrangement of folk songs. Fäyzi also is known as a collector of Tatar musical folklore. His works include articles on Tatar musical culture, librettos, plays, novels and poetry.  Ğabdulla Tuqay TASSR State Prize laureate (1966).

References and notes

1910 births
1973 deaths
Tatar people of the Soviet Union
Soviet composers
Soviet male composers
Tatar music